Torqabeh (also Romanized as Ţorqabeh, Ţoroqbeh, and Torqebeh; also known as Targhobeh) is a city and capital of Torqabeh and Shandiz County, in Razavi Khorasan Province, Iran. At the 2006 census, its population was 13,158, in 3,668 families.

One of its customary local foods is Dizi. Another common choice of food among the frequent visitors of the town is Shishlik, which is grilled lamb and T-bone accompanied by rice.

Torghabeh is particularly popular with people in Mashhad primarily because of its proximity, variety of traditional restaurants and souvenir shops. To some people, driving to Torghabeh and Jaghargh (dour-dour), drinking Ab-Ali Dough, and driving back home, has become a ritual! Jaghargh is also popular with professional and amateur bikers. To many Mashhadi bikers, Fridays are in part about riding their bikes to Torghabeh and Jaghargh.

References 

Populated places in Torqabeh and Shandiz County
Nishapur Quarter
Cities in Razavi Khorasan Province

mashhad